SADL may refer to:

 Sainte-Anne-des-Lacs, Quebec
 The International Civil Aviation Organization airport code for La Plata Airport
 Semantic Application Design Language, a language for building semantic models
 Situation Awareness Data Link, an example component of an Enhanced Position Location Reporting System
 The Southern Alberta Digital Library at the University of Lethbridge
 System Architecture Description Language, an implementation of an Architecture description language

See also 
 Sadler (name), its abbreviation